Chapirevula is one of the old villages in Nandyal Mandal of Kurnool district, Andhra Pradesh, India.

Geography 
Chapirevula lies in the western part of Andhra Pradesh. This region is bounded by thick Nallamala forests. A canal from the Telugu Ganga project and SRBC canal flow near Chapirevula making the land fertile.

Demographics 
Chapirevula has a population of over 5,000. Males constitute ~48% of the population and females ~52%. Chapirevula has an average literacy rate of 45%: male literacy is ~50%. In Chapirevula, 50% of the population is above 40 years of age as many of the educated left the village to pursue their careers in cities like Nandyal and Hyderabad and foreign countries like the United States of America.

References

External links 
 Chapirevula

Villages in Kurnool district